Euclera diversipennis is a species of moth of the subfamily Arctiinae first described by Francis Walker in 1854. It is found in Brazil (Amazonas, Tefé, São Paulo) and Peru.

References

Arctiinae